Amanda Dennis (born February 5, 1994) is an American goalball player who competes in international-level events.

References

External links 
 
 

1994 births
Living people
Sportspeople from Atlanta
Paralympic goalball players of the United States
Goalball players at the 2012 Summer Paralympics
Goalball players at the 2016 Summer Paralympics
Medalists at the 2016 Summer Paralympics
Paralympic medalists in goalball
Paralympic bronze medalists for the United States
Medalists at the 2011 Parapan American Games
Medalists at the 2015 Parapan American Games
Medalists at the 2019 Parapan American Games
Goalball players at the 2020 Summer Paralympics